is a museum of history and natural history in Hakodate Park, Hakodate, Hokkaidō, Japan. The forerunner of the current museum, the Hakodate Provisional Museum, building one, opened in May 1879, the second building in 1884, and the third building (later demolished) in 1891. In 1932 the first building became the Fisheries Pavilion and the second the Indigenous Peoples Pavilion. Legislation to create the current museum was passed in 1948, and the Hakodate City Museum opened in April 1966.

Gallery

See also

 Hakodate City Museum of Northern Peoples
 List of Cultural Properties of Japan - paintings (Hokkaidō)
 List of Cultural Properties of Japan - historical materials (Hokkaidō)
 Shiryōkaku

References

External links
  Hakodate City Museum
  Hakodate City Museum Digital Archives

Museums in Hakodate
Museums established in 1879
1879 establishments in Japan